St. Thomas's Church, is a redundant Church of Ireland church on Cathal Brugha Street, Dublin.

History
The church was designed by the architect Fredrick G. Hicks and it was opened in 1931; it won the 1932-33 Royal Institute of Architects Ireland Prize. It was built to replace St. Thomas's Church on Marlborough Street, which was destroyed by fire during the Irish Civil War in 1922. It is situated on Cathal Brugha Street, between Findlater Place and Marlborough Street.

With the decline in Church of Ireland congregations, the parish of St. Thomas merged in 1966 with the parish of St. George. In 1990 the church was renamed the Church of St. Thomas and St. George. St. George's Brass Band moved to Cathal Brugha Street.

Over the years a number of other Christian denominations were allowed to use the church, including Orthodox, Filipino Christians and the Anglican Igbo Speaking Community. St. Thomas Indian Orthodox Church use the building for their weekly services, and from 2006 it became their parish church.

St. Thomas's ceased to be the Church of Ireland parish church in 2017. The parishes of Drumcondra and North Strand (Waterloo Avenue) serve as the nearest parish churches for the Anglican community.

As of 2021, there is a growing movement to return the church to its parishioners.

References

Churches completed in 1931
Church of Ireland churches in Dublin (city)
20th-century churches in the Republic of Ireland